Forrayah George Warrington Nathaniel Bass (born 12 March 1995) is an English footballer who plays as a forward.

He formerly played for Bradford City, as a left back and midfielder.

Career
After playing youth football for both Leeds United and Bradford City, Bass made his senior debut for Bradford City on 18 December 2012 in the FA Cup, where he was substituted for fellow debutant Nathan Curtis during extra time.

He later played college soccer for Louisburg College and San Diego State.

Career statistics

References

1995 births
Living people
English footballers
Leeds United F.C. players
Bradford City A.F.C. players
Association football forwards
English expatriate footballers
English expatriate sportspeople in the United States
Expatriate soccer players in the United States
Louisburg Hurricanes men's soccer players
San Diego State Aztecs men's soccer players